Jalapa, Oaxaca may refer to:

Santa María Jalapa del Marqués
San Felipe Jalapa de Díaz
Jalapa del Valle